Camp Ondessonk is a rustic, outdoor, Catholic youth camp run by the Belleville Diocese. It is located in the Shawnee National Forest of Southern Illinois, near Ozark, Illinois. The camp strives to remain a “last frontier” of sorts, where participants can experience life away from the plugged in world of today's society, and go back to a time of outdoor living while experiencing nature to the fullest. Camp Ondessonk states their mission to be "to provide an environment that inspires physical, mental, emotional, and spiritual growth for individuals and groups through the appreciation and stewardship of nature." Camp Ondessonk is accredited by the American Camp Association.

History

Over 50 Years of Camp Tradition
Beginning in the summer of 1957, Camp St. Philip  is part of the Diocese of Belleville. Having no facilities of their own, the parish rented out Camp Piasa in Grafton Illinois in 1957 and Camp Vandeventer in Waterloo Illinois in 1958. Each summer, the camps were staffed by seminarians and college students all under the direction of Monsignor John T. Fournie.

Camp St. Philip offered participants traditional camp activities such as riflery, archery, swimming, and handicrafts, as well as some unique summer camp activities such as cooking, housekeeping, and axmanship. The camp also offered a camping honor society similar to the one found at Camp Ondessonk today. Campers at St. Philip spent their nights in one of five units; Marquette, LaSalle, LaLande, Brebeuf, and Hennepin. Led by a desire for a permanent location for a Catholic youth camp, Monsignor Robert DeGasperi oversaw the effort to gain leases of the land that would become Camp Ondessonk.

Volunteer crews began construction on the new summer camp in spring of 1959 in a race to finish before the scheduled opening on June 28, 1959. The first major building of the camp was established with the pouring of the foundation for the dining hall. Parishes from various parts of Southern Illinois provided funds and volunteer builders. Volunteer tradesmen gave their time on weekends to provide plumbing and carpentry skills. Older high school boys and seminarians volunteered their time during the week. They spent days building cabins with handsaws and evenings in a farmhouse near the camp location. As the first week of June approached, none of the units were complete yet. A week before opening day a bathhouse was built, although it lacked a water heater, and a well was dug to provide fresh water. As children and parents arrived on opening day, volunteers scrambled to finish building the last of the bunks in the cabins.

During the first summer of camp in its new location, 481 campers and 52 staff attended over the four-week period that camp ran. As they arrived, campers were placed in one of four of the original units: Brebeuf, Chabanel, Goupil, and LaLande. Because Camp Ondessonk did not yet have a lake for swimming or boating, campers used a section of Ozark Creek now known as “Blue Pool” for water activities. Archery took place near where Amantacha now sits and riflery was located in the same area it currently resides in over 50 years later. For the first few years of camp, riflery was not offered during girls’ season. The first stables were located on what is now the “Brebeuf Flats” and consisted of a stable building built by volunteers in one weekend, and a jumbled herd of horses donated to camp. Another activity area, camp crafts, taught campers how to use knives, axes, ropes, and open-fire cooking. There were also nature hikes and wildlife sightings. The first camp infirmary was located on a rock near the back end of the original dining hall. Although the Golden Arrowhead did not make its debut until a few years after Camp Ondessonk's beginning, the very first summer of camp featured the Silver Bearclaw, which was awarded to the unit that earned the most points throughout the week. Other awards were given over the next few years including Tongas and Kachinas.

The summers of the early years of camp were split between an all boys’ season and an all girls’ season. It wasn't until later that coed sessions were introduced. While the first summer of Camp Ondessonk was only four weeks long, increased demand forced the adding of additional weeks. In 1960 the summer season was extended to four weeks of boys’ camp and three weeks of girls. Two new units were added for the 1960 season, and 1,804 campers attended during the seven-week season. Lake St. Isaac was added in the winter of 1960-1961 giving campers a place for swimming and watercraft activities. The summer of 1962 also saw the addition of activity arrowheads and the Golden Arrowhead. Growth of the camp facilities continued over the next few years including more units (making a total of seven in 1964: Brebeuf, Chabanel, Daniel, Garnier, Goupil, LaLande, and Lalemant), the B.O.Q., and a new infirmary. An agreement was also made in 1964 with the United States Department of Conservation and Forestry giving camp use of the surrounding Shawnee National Forest and expanding the camp acreage to 4,585 acres.

By 1965, the summer enrollment reached 4,380 campers with 120 staff members. “Pioneer Weeks,” or two-week sessions were introduced as well as the addition of the Tarzan swing, a diving platform, and a zipline in the same summer. During the summer session, a cabin in Tekakwitha burned down due to a candle left burning by a camper. No one was in the cabin at the time and the other two cabins of the unit were saved. The cabin was a complete loss along with almost all of the camper belongings that had been in it. The campers staying there chose to stick out the rest of the week, with their parents bringing them new clothing and such, and the cabin was later rebuilt. In 1967 Amantacha became the first tree house unit. The trading post building was also constructed the same year allowing it to move out of the small section of the Administration Building it had been previously housed in. In May 1968, Lake Echon was completed giving campers a separate lake for boating and swimming. To connect the units on the east side of the lake to the main area, the Larry Garner Memorial Bridge was constructed spanning a 210-foot stretch. The Covered Bridge was also constructed in 1968 by volunteers from Saint Mary's Parish. That same year also saw the addition of four new shower houses and a roadway around almost all of Lake Echon, which replaced the dirt roads and trails.

1969 brought the addition of female staff during boys’ season and the early 1970s brought the addition of campers and staff from Chicago as well as staff from around the country and international staff members. To help with the expanding number of campers, Ahatsistari and Lalemant which had been tent units were rebuilt in order to accommodate more campers. The all-day exploration was added in 1972 giving campers the chance to explore the land around them. A camp favorite was added in 1975 with the addition of the Friday Marathon. By 1976, Ondessonk was in need of updates and renovations. The Garnier tree houses were built upshore from where the Garnier cabins had sat and the Amantacha bridge was added to replace the various methods of getting campers across Lake Echon. Chabanel was moved to its current location in 1979 and the LaLande cabins were rebuilt into tree houses in 1981. Many of the units adopted their three-sided look in the late 1970s through the mid-1980s based on the inspiration of a Polynesian design discovered on a trip to Walt Disney World. Garnier was the first unit to undergo the changes and after some experimenting the new design was deemed a success.

A new barn was added in the pastures in 1983 and a new modern health center was added in 1986. A new registration process was added in 1988, which allowed campers to indicate a unit preference in their applications. By 1989 the units of Teondecoren and Ahatsistari were no longer available to campers as a unit choice. However, they were still used in overbooking situations or for special circumstances. The two units were eventually dismantled due to lack of need for 12 units. Coed sessions were added in 1989 and eventually surpassed the popularity of separate gender seasons. This required some reorganization as a boys’ and girls’ side of the lake was designated, separate bathhouses were issued, and brother/sister units were developed. In 1995, Teondecoren was transformed into a tepee unit located in the upper pastures. This set up did not last long and the tepees later made appearances in Chabanel, Raganeau, the Brebeuf Flats, and even in the remnants of Ahatsistari. Specialty Camps were introduced in the summer of 1992 and would later evolve into the Adventure Camp Programs.

In 1996, camp reached a major achievement when it earned accreditation from the American Camp Association. The Blob made its debut in the swimming area in the late 1990s but was later removed for safety reasons. Mini camp was introduced for younger campers in 1999. The new dining hall was opened for the summer of 2004 and a Coed CIT program was added the same summer. Ondessonk achieved accreditation from the Certified Horsemanship Association in 2003 as well. Throughout the early 2000s various camp activities were introduced and different adventure programs were tried for brief periods. 2006 saw the return of “Camp Time” during which time was set back an hour at Sunday evening dinner and 2008 saw the removal of brother/sister units during coed season. New activities and programs continue to be added as camp evolves with the changing times around it in the “real world.”

Tommy the Bear
Camp Ondessonk welcomed possibly the most iconic member of its family in July 1966 when it acquired Tommy the Bear. Omar's Bikini Club near East St. Louis advertised a bear for sale after it failed as a dancing attraction. Camp personnel became interested in housing the bear at camp, however, they had no way to transport the bear from its location in Belleville to Ondessonk.

Omar Monds agreed to donate the bear if Ondessonk was willing to take it and camp was willing to take the bear if Monds could deliver the bear and get it into the cage that camp had set up. Arriving at camp in the back of a Miller High Life beer truck driven by the bar owner, Omar Monds, the owner of a beer distribution company, Chick Fritz, and one of Mr. Monds employees, Tommy was welcomed to his new home where he would live for the next 28 years. Over the following years, Tommy was fed dog food, candy from campers, and leftovers from staff. Tommy managed to make an escape from the enclosure a time or two, although he always returned later.

On July 7, 1981, a camper received a minor wound on his hand when he reached into the cage during feeding time and grabbed at Tommy's ears. The camper was treated by health services at camp, but the wound later became infected. This led to the camper's parents to worry that their son may have contracted rabies from the bear. A court ordered Tommy to be examined for rabies but this could only be accomplished by killing the bear so that his brain tissue could be examined. Tommy's lawyer quickly appealed the decision to a local court which overturned the decision. As Tommy's fate was being decided, campers and staff fought to save him. They set up patrols at night to ensure that authorities could not enter into camp during the night and take him away. County authorities set up their own patrols around the outermost parts of camp to ensure that Tommy was not removed and hidden from authorities by camp neighbors. Finally, after multiple legal proceedings, the injured camper's family dropped the lawsuit thus saving Tommy's life. Tommy, who was then 22 years old, was able to resume his position as a camp icon.

After the death of Tommy the Bear in 1994, Yonah the Bear came to camp in December 1995. He was found wandering near Mount Vernon, Illinois and was given the name Yonah, meaning “bear spirit” in Cherokee. Yonah lived in the cage formerly occupied by Tommy, as the camp bear until his death in 2001.

Symbol of Camp Ondessonk
The symbol of Camp Ondessonk is a circle with a cross coming out of the top and seven stars surrounding it representing the eight North American Martyrs. The circle represents an ‘O’ for Ondessonk one of the eight martyrs, Issac Jogues, and for the world. The other seven are represented with stars on the camp symbol. The two stars on the top left represent St. Jean de Brébeuf and St. Gabriel Lalemant. The star on the top right represents St. Jean de Lalande. The four remaining martyrs and represented with stars on the bottom right, St. René Goupil, St. Antoine Daniel, St. Noël Chabanel, and St. Charles Garnier. The cross represents a world dedicated to Christ. It also serves as a reminder of Camp Ondessonk's beginning as a camp only for Catholic children from the Diocese of Belleville through its evolvement to today of being open to children of any religion.

Namesakes
The name "Ondessonk" is the Huron word for "Bird of Prey." It is the name that the Huron gave to St. Isaac Jogues when he was serving among them as a Jesuit missionary, because of his black robe. Jogues came to this country from France in the early 17th century in an effort to bring the Gospel to the American Indians. He ended up giving his life to this task when he was tortured and later martyred.

Several other Jesuit missionaries working among the Huron during this time were martyred as well. These saints and their American Indian companions are honored and remembered at Camp Ondessonk with the camp units, lakes, and major land forms named after them. The North American martyrs are:
 St. Isaac Jogues
 St. Jean de Brébeuf
 St. Noël Chabanel
 St. Antoine Daniel
 St. Charles Garnier
 St. René Goupil
 St. Jean de Lalande
 St. Gabriel Lalemant

Others whom places around camp were named for:
 Amantacha, baptized as Louis de Sainte-Foi, was a Huron educated in France under the instruction of Antoine Daniel. He later became a friend and aide of the Jesuit missionaries.
 Paul Ragueneau, a Jesuit missionary who was a part of the Huron mission and worked under the instruction of Fathers Jean de Brébeuf and Jérôme Lalemant (uncle to the martyr Gabriel Lalemant) for eight years. The unit of Raganeau uses a slightly different spelling of his name.
 St. Kateri Tekakwitha, originally known as Catherine Tekakwitha and informally known as Lily of the Mohawks was an Algonquin and Iroquois Native American woman from New France and an early convert to Roman Catholicism. She was recognized as the first Native American saint in 2012.
 Echon, is the name given to Jean de Brébeuf by the Huron. It means "Healing Tree", as a representation of how much Brébeuf helped the Hurons and of the medicines he brought them from Europe. Another interpretation of Echon is "he who bears the heavy load", as Brébeuf was massive in stature and carried more than his share when working with the Huron people.

Previously existing units namesakes:
 Eustace Ahatsistari, honored as the greatest war chief of all the Huron nations, was accompanying Goupil and Couture through enemy territory when the group was captured by the Mohawk Indians. Ahatsistari's name possibly means, "he who cooks with fire," which was fitting as he was a brutal warrior all the way to the end of his life, when he managed to literally spit fire at the Mohawk Indians who were torturing him.
 Guillaume Couture, a French missionary who worked with Isaac Jogues among the Huron. He was ambushed and tortured by the Iroquois but later became a part of the Iroquois councils when he impressed his captors with his endurance and continuous dignity throughout his torture. He was the only European to ever obtain such an honorable position.
 Joseph Teondechoren, a Huron medicine man later turned missionary. His brother, Joseph Chiwatenhwa, is known as "the forgotten martyr" or "the first Huron martyr." Teondechoren refused baptism during Joseph Chiwatenhwa's lifetime but quickly converted days after his brother's surprise death and took on the name Joseph in honor of his brother. He carried on Chiwatenhwa's missionary work among the Hurons. At one point he was a part of the missionary group that was captured and tortured by the Iroquois and included Jogues, Couture, and Goupil. The unit of Teondecoren used a slightly different spelling of his name.

Facilities
Camp Ondessonk is a rustic outdoor camp. It consists of ten units to house campers as well as a variety of program areas.

Program Areas
 Archery Range
 The Barn
 Boating Area
 Climbing Wall
 Chapel
 The Grotto
 Handicrafts Pavilion
 High Ropes Course
 Rifle Range
 Swimming Area
 Woodsmanship

Units
Each of the units at Camp Ondessonk consist of a group of four or five camper cabins and one staff cabin. The cabins are rustic style lodging without electricity generally consisting of three-walled structures open on the front. Each unit also has its own water spigot, outhouse, and campfire ring.

The units can be sorted into four different categories based on cabin type. The first is tree houses which are structures set off the ground featuring A-frame roofs, three closed sides, and a maze of catwalks connecting all the cabins. Most of the tree houses are set back in the forest. The major exception is the Goupil tree houses which are located on top of a 40-foot cliff and are accessible via a winding 75 step staircase. Next is the Brebeuf cabins which resemble the tree houses but sit on the ground. Chabanel is known as the cave unit as its cabins are tucked under a sandstone amphitheater found in a natural grotto. The cabins in this unit consist of platforms on the ground with bunks and a tin roof. When it rains campers in this unit are able to enjoy a natural waterfall, however, the nature of the unit's location causes campers to experience permanent dampness in all of their gear. The final type of cabins is the Tekakwitha Lodges featuring four-walled A-frame buildings with screened in windows and doors. Whereas most units have a staff member cabin that allows staff to keep an eye on campers from an adjacent location, the Tekakwitha lodges have a small staff room attached to each so staff members are always nearby. This makes Tekakwitha the perfect unit for younger campers or those nervous about their first stay away from home. Shower houses are located near each unit and multiple units share shower house facilities.

Each unit is named after one of the North American martyrs or another significant figure to Catholicism. As part of their unique personalities, each unit is represented by a color and spirit animal. The cabins of each unit are also named after songs by a particular musician or group. The units are arranged around Lake Echon with girls on the East side and boys on the West.

Gender only applies during coed season during which boys and girls are separated into units. During girls season and boys season all available units are open to all campers regardless of whether the unit is located on the "girls" or "boys" side of the lake.

Other Sleeping Areas
Camp Ondessonk also has two additional camper sleeping areas.
 The BOQ (Boy's Only Quarters) is on the boys side of the lake. It is used to house male CITs and adventure campers. It also provides overflow housing for male staff. The BOQ is the only camper housing that has electricity.
 Lakeside is located on the girls side of the lake. It consists of one long bunkhouse style cabin as well as two smaller cabins. It is used to house female CITs and adventure campers.

Former units

 Gender did not apply to these units because there was no coed season of summer camp during the time during which they were around. The first six weeks of camp was for boys and the last six weeks of camp was for girls. Ahatsistari was located on the "girls" side of the lake and when Teondecoren became a cabin unit it was located on the "boys" side of the lake, however neither was an official unit when coed sessions were introduced. Couture never had a permanent location in camp on either side of the lake and was more of a "floating" tent unit used whenever and wherever was necessary.

Primitive Units
In 1969, a new type of unit was introduced; the Primitive Units of Teondecoren and Couture. The Primitive Units gave campers a unique experience, away from camp, during which they lived off the land for the week. Teondecoren was located at Pine Lake and consisted of Conestoga wagons of the Old West that had been donated to camp. Later, members of the primitive units built their own tree houses about 13 feet off the ground by lashing wood they gathered to trees. The tree houses were accessible only by rope ladder. Campers in Teondecoren lived off the land, and made the unit a popular visiting spot for other units on the Wednesday night overnight. During the day they would hike around the area and swim in Pine Lake as they learned valuable survival skills. In keeping with the primitive theme of the unit, the girls of the Primitives were known to make their own clothing out of feed sacks from the stables to wear during the week. In 1973, Teondecoren was made into a cabin unit when camp was overbooked for a coming week and the cabins supposedly had to be built by staff the weekend before.

The unit of Couture was originally located in lower Pakentuck and was made up of tents. It was later moved to a location near the main area of camp and even to a position along Camp Road for a time. When Couture was no longer a unit the tents were used to expand other units in camp. The Primitive Units were used to accommodate higher volumes of campers as more than 4,000 campers were attending each summer. Members of the primitive units came back into camp to participate in activities such as horsemanship and riflery, as well as the Tuesday and Thursday evening activities. Although the Primitive Units were eventually disbanded, Couture made a return in the mid-1980s due to overbooking. The tent unit was placed off the parking lot in the former Frontier Unit's tent practice area. In order to encourage campers to stay in the temporary unit, they were promised exclusive use of shower house C. This resurrected unit of Couture was only around for one year.

Pioneer Sessions
Pioneer sessions were introduced in 1965. Although not technically a unit, the pioneer sessions were unique in that they were two weeks long allowing campers a more in-depth camping experience. During their stay campers were given extra time and opportunities to participate in their favorite activities. The highlight of their stay was an overnight canoe trip to Lake of Egypt. Campers traveled in the back of a stake bed truck to a peninsula of Lake of Egypt, from which they would paddle to another peninsula on the lake to camp out during the night. Campers carried all their food and gear in the canoes with them. The Pioneer sessions were an early experiment for camp with trips away from camp. As Frontier units were later introduced the Pioneer sessions were discontinued. The early 2000s saw a return of two-week sessions in the form of Mega Camp. This allowed campers the chance to stay two weeks and participate in extra activities such as the climbing wall and teams course. Although no such program currently exists, campers may attend as many concurrent sessions as they qualify for according to gender.

Frontier Units
The early 1970s brought the addition of the Frontier Units to camp programming. Although they were referred to as units, the Frontier program was actually a separate experience from camp, during which participants traveled to places such as Utah, Colorado, and the Bahamas. The program was open to all high school students and brought in an additional 2000 campers per summer to Ondessonk. Because the trips left from Camp, dorms were built on the north end of the parking lot to house participants the night before leaving on their trips. The very first Frontier trip went to Rocky Mountain National Park. It included side trips to Estes Park, the Trail Ridge Road, and Milner Pass, as well as a trail ride along the Continental Divide. As new administration was brought in and summer programming went through changes, the Frontier units were phased out so only one trip to Utah was left by 1986.

In the late 1970s the Silver and Golden Frontier Program was added. Inspired by the original Frontier units, the Silver and Golden Frontier trips catered to adults wishing to travel around the country. The first Silver Frontier trip went to Florida and visited sites like Daytona Beach, St. Augustine, Cape Kennedy, and Disney World. The Golden Frontier trips were slightly different in that they traveled by cruise ship in the Caribbean. They visited four different countries along the way. As they became more popular the trips expanded to include visits to places such as Nashville, TN., Ireland, Rome, and the Holy Land.

Facility areas

Dining Hall
The dining hall is a modern facility that can serve all of camp at one time. The building is heptagonal and has a fireplace in the center. It is located away from main camp, on top of the same hill as the stables. Most meals are served family style. The dining hall is air conditioned, and has windows on all sides to allow for ventilation. It is decorated with art work depicting camp that was created by current and former staff members as well as friends of camp. The dining hall had air conditioning installed for the summer of 2013.

Health Center
This Health Center is known as one of the top medical facilities in an ACA accredited summer camp.  Stocked with first aid and a wide variety of other medical equipment, covering multiple possible emergencies, this building is equipped and ready for all of the campers, staff, and volunteers Ondessonk hosts throughout the year.  Staffed by medical professionals and on call pediatric physicians every day of the summer, there is never a moment without someone who is able to provide help. With it being one of the only places with air conditioning, it is known as an excuse to be the spot to relax and cool down for a bit.

Old Dining Hall
An old wooden cafeteria that is no longer used for eating because of its size. It is still used for various reasons including last day breakfast, skit (if it is raining) etc. There is now a bigger dining hall that is used but it is farther from the main area.

Trading Post
A store in the main area that sells food and items such as: toiletries, camp gear, camp paraphernalia, soda on certain days, and ice cream/candy.

Natural areas and all-day hike destinations

Pakentuck
The largest single, free-flowing waterfall in Illinois, and it is conveniently in camp property. It is named after a Boy Scout group from Paducah, Kentucky.

The Spillway
Right next to the unit of Garnier. It is where the lake meets a small waterfall.

Split Rocks
Rocks that have split to the point when campers are taken through some on their all day hikes. One of the split rocks is Augustin's Agony.  Some others are Little Split and Fat Man's Misery.

Hog's Bluff 
A large, natural, stone peak jutting high above a lake. It was allegedly used as a trading post for Native Americans.

Bush's Garden 
A stream near the spillway. It was popularized by a counselor with the last name Bushong, nickname Bush.

Cannonball Rock 
A boulder in a stream that is just high enough to cannonball off of. Surrounded by other areas of stream that are great for catching crawdads and skipping rocks.

Summer camp program

Traditional camp
The original camp program of Ondessonk, traditional camp allows participants to experience all the long-standing activities camp is valued for. The traditional camp session at Camp Ondessonk is known for offering the basic camp experience, but in a more nature enriched way than may be found at other summer camps. During their week-long session campers have the opportunity to try their hand at a variety of activities including archery, riflery, handicrafts, horsemanship, canoeing, kayaking, swimming, and outdoor skills. In the evenings campers are part all-camp activities including campfires, a variation of flashlight tag, an overnight campout, and a Native American ceremony. As part of their camp experience, campers stay in “rustic” units usually consisting of three-walled structures open in the front. The units give campers the chance to bond more closely with their cabin mates as well as the 30 or so other campers in their unit. They also act as families for campers for the week as units attend activities and compete in all-camp activities together. Traditional Camp is open to campers ages 10–15 and offers sessions in three variations of gender settings. They are co-ed camp, girls camp, and boys camp.
 Coed Camp: These sessions feature all the activities of camp, just presented in a coed setting. This allows campers to develop their skills in a real-world setting of coed living. Sleeping quarters in camp and on the overnight are gender specific and campers are supervised by the appropriate staff.
 Girls Camp: Referred to as “girls season,” two weeks of each summer are dedicated to providing a single-gender environment for girls. Participants of girls camp take part in all of the same activities as coed and boys campers. All available units are open to all campers during girls season and all units are staffed by female staff members.
 Boys Camp: One week of each summer is “boys season” during which only male campers are in camp. The single-gender environment is meant to encourage campers to grow and enjoy camp without the pressure to perform in front of the opposite gender. Boys camp participants engage in all the activities of coed and girls camp. As with girls camp, all available units are open to all campers during boys season and are staffed by Ondessonk's male staff members.

Activity Areas
 Archery: One of the two range activities offered at Ondessonk, archery allows campers to try their hand at shooting a standard recurve bow. During their time in archery, campers will have the chance to aim for the bulls eye under the guidance of trained range staff following the guidelines of the National Archery Association.
 Boating: During their time in boating, campers are given the option of going out on Lake Echon in either a canoe or kayak. Boating staff members instruct campers on proper boat technique and etiquette. Campers are required to wear a life jacket at all times and are supervised by Red Cross Certified Lifeguards during their time on the water. Row boating was an option at one point in time, but was taken away due to lack of interest.
 Council: This activity area offers campers a quiet moment in their day during which they receive insight and background on the people who inspired the unique names found around camp. Campers learn about the North American martyrs and the Native Americans they worked with.
 Handicrafts: Giving campers the chance to make something they can take home, handicrafts introduces campers to the art of boondoggling, leather stamping, friendship bracelet making, hemp weaving, or tie-dying. Staff members are on hand to assist campers with the various activities.
 Horsemanship: Each week campers spend time in the barn where they participate in a short arena lessons before heading out on a one-hour trail ride. Campers are assigned a horse for their ride based on previous experience and size. They are required to wear a helmet at all times while riding as well as being required to wear long pants and closed-toed shoes for riding. If campers choose to do so they may return to the barn during Choose Your Own Adventure for a two-hour trail ride.
 Nature/Woodsmanship: Unique in that campers don't actually visit the nature area with their units, campers do have the option to participate in the activities there during Choose Your Own Adventure. The main nature activity that units do engage in together is the all-day exploration. On the all-day exploration campers and their units set out after breakfast for a hike through the surrounding Shawnee National Forest. Nature staff lead campers as they discover the natural beauty that surrounds them and aallowscampers to see some of the natural rock formations found in the area. Along the way campers have the opportunity to stop and swim in the streams and lakes they pass as well as partaking in a picnic lunch along the trail. Units return to camp in the late afternoon in time to shower before dinner. For campers that do choose to visit the nature activity area on their own later in the week, skills such as fire-building, shelter building, and orienteering can be studied.
 Riflery: The second of the range activities, riflery gives campers the chance to try shooting .22 caliber rifles. In order to assist the campers with their stability while firing the rifles, campers shoot while lying down on mattresses on the ground. Riflery staff instruct campers on proper shooting technique and safety as they load the rifles themselves and shoot at targets.
 Swimming: Upon arrival at camp on Sunday, campers take a swim test to judge their swimming abilities. The test involves swimming a length across the swimming area, located in Lake St. Isaac. When campers visit the swimming area with their unit later in the week they have the opportunity to use the slides, Tarzan swing, and zip line. Campers also have the chance to swim in other areas of the Shawnee at different times during the week. In all swimming areas campers are supervised by a Red Cross Certified Lifeguard.

Evening Activities
 Mass/Opening Campfire: Sunday evening begins with Mass in the grotto shared by a local priest. The service includes a chance for campers of the Catholic faith to receive communion, and campers of various faiths to receive a blessing if they so choose. As part of Ondessonk's openness to campers of all faiths, the service is focused on song and sharing the faith in that form. Directly after mass opening campfire begins during which the theme of the week is introduced, skits from each activity area are performed by the staff in that area, and classic camp songs are sung. True to its name a large bonfire is lit to help create the atmosphere of the first night campers will spend at camp.
 Unit Campfire: Monday night, each unit gathers at their unit fire ring to enjoy a campfire and group bonding time. During the campfire, unit leaders will discuss what will happen during the week and campers learn their unit cheers, roast marshmallows, and bond as a unit.
 Tuesday Night Game/Moonlight Gold Rush: Each Tuesday night, all of camp participates in a cross of extreme flashlight tag, hide-and-go-seek, and capture the flag. The game is played after dark and campers are encouraged to dress in all black to blend in with the night. During the game, campers are given a choice of being in three different groups; the walkers, slashies, and hiders. The three groups have different levels of intensity, with walkers being the most tame position, and slashies being the most extreme assignment.
 Overnight: Wednesday night sees all of the units head out to spend a night sleeping out under the stars. Each unit is assigned a different spot in the woods or pastures surrounding camp, where they will get to experience nature up close at night. For dinner, campers dress their own burgers which are cooked in the coals of the fire called foil burgers. In the morning, campers return to their units for a cold breakfast delivered to them.
 Lodge Ceremony: Thursday night the campers experience the induction ceremony of the Loyal Lodge of Ondessonk and Tekakwitha. This is the Service Organization of Camp Ondessonk.
 Closing Campfire: As Friday brings campers week to an end, they attend the closing campfire. Another large bonfire is lit and each unit presents a skit that campers have prepared. Camp songs accompany the presentation of skits. The campfire acts as one last hurrah for campers as they prepare to say goodbye the following morning.

Overnight Locations
 Bush's Garden
 Durbin's Barn
 Indian Kitchen
 Kane Lake
 Lower Pastures
 Morgan's Field East
 Morgan's Field West
 Pakentuck
 Pepsisawah (Upper Pakentuck)
 Phantoms Canyon
 Pine Alley
 Pine Lake
 Timmy's Well
 Sycamore Spirits
 Vega's Vista

Mini camp and mini camp explorers
Designed with 8 and 10 year old campers in mind, mini camp is meant to be an introduction to the camp experience. At just three days and three nights long, mini campers are able to get a taste of many of the activities of traditional camp. The mini campers are able to stay in enclosed cabin units, Aonnetta (girls) and Chiwatenwha (boys). Some activities are modified to account for the difference in age of mini campers from traditional campers. Participants of the program stay in one of the units and are accompanied by extra staff members at all times to provide enhanced guidance and companionship for the younger campers. Mini camp explorers is for more adventurous 8 and 9-year-olds who feel capable of spending the entire week at camp. Because of the extended nature of their stay, campers are able to participate in all the activities of traditional camp in a modified form for their age and abilities. Campers spend their nights in either Chiwatenwha or Aonnetta with staff trained to take on the challenges of younger campers experiencing their first week-long sleepaway camp stay.

Adventure programs
Camp Ondessonk offers specialized programs, referred to as adventure camp, that allow campers to focus on one set of skills in a particular area for an entire week. The main areas of focus are horsemanship, rock climbing, backpacking, mountain biking, and canoeing. The programs take a limited number of campers and provide them with the opportunity to enhance their knowledge and skills of a particular area. Campers are assisted by two or three specially trained staff members. As with traditional campers, all adventure campers are eligible for induction into Lodge. The adventure programs are divided into three levels based on the challenge offered and skill required by each program. Beginner adventures, formerly known as level one, is the first level meant for campers who want to build their skills while still enjoying a traditional camp experience in the evenings. Campers stay in a unit as in traditional camp. No prior experience in the area of focus is required. Beginner adventures include Horse Camp, Rock Camp, and Hike, Bike, Paddle, and Climb. Intermediate adventures, formerly called level two programs, offer a more intense experience and greater challenge to campers. During an intermediate adventure, campers spend more time away from the main area of camp in the natural areas surrounding Ondessonk. Most nights of the program are spent camping out under the stars in the babackcountryIntermediate adventures give participants the chance to receive more advanced instruction and develop their skills to a greater level. Although campers spend most of their time away from main camp, they do return at the end of the week to participate in the all-camp activities on Friday. Intermediate adventure programs include Horse Adventure, Rock Adventure, Mountain Biking Adventure, and Camper vs. Wild. Intermediate adventures do not require prior experience in their field of focus, however, it is recommended. The final level of adventure programs is advanced adventures, formerly known as level three. This level is recommended for only those experienced in the Ondessonk adventure programs. Advanced adventures offer an intense and challenging opportunity to expand on the skills learned in the beginner and intermediate levels. As with intermediate adventures, campers spend most of their time away from main camp building their skills on the trails around camp. There are two advanced adventures offered, Horse Expedition and River Adventure.

Horse Camp
This program is designed for participants wanting an enhanced experience in horsemanship while still enjoying many of the all-camp activities of traditional camp. Campers spend their days in the stables learning such things as how to care for and groom their horses, as well as receiving more in-depth instruction in riding skills and general horsemanship. Participants are able to experience longer trail rides than in traditional camp while still utilizing the trails and pastures in the nearby surroundings of camp. Each evening campers return to main camp to participate in the evening activities and stay in one of the units. This is a beginner adventure and is open to campers ages 12–15.

Horse Adventure
One of the longest running adventure programs at Ondessonk, Horse Adventure offers a unique in-depth horsemanship experience for campers wanting an enhanced journey away from the main areas of camp. Although campers do return to main camp at the end of the week to participate in the final all-camp activities, most days and nights are spent on the trail in the back-country. Each evening, campers help to take care of the horses, cook meals, and set up the campsite. As night falls, campers have the opportunity to relax around the campfire before sleeping out under the stars each night. During the program, campers receive instruction and supervision from CHA (Certified Horsemanship Association) certified instructors that help them to not only expand their horsemanshipskills, but also to develop their outdoors skills. This is an intermediate adventure open to campers ages 13–16.

Horse Expedition
Before its retirement, Horse Expedition took campers on a two-week journey that pushed them in their equestrian skills. Participants received advanced instruction in horsemanship, horse-packing, trail stewardship, and outdoor living skills as they were led on a backcountry pack trip by experienced Ondessonk wranglers. Campers were able to discover much of the natural beauty of the Shawnee as they rode through the various trails encompassed within the forest. The intense nature of the program mandated prior experience and possible participants must have completed a level one or two equestrian program prior to entering Horse Expedition. This was an advanced adventure open to experienced campers ages 14–18.

Rock Camp
Designed as an introduction to rock climbing, campers learn the basics about climbing knots and safety systems while developing their climbing technique. Participants have the opportunity to try out the high ropes course as well as having the chance to climb multiple sandstone top-rope routes in the Pakentuck area just outside camp. Following the same format as Horse Camp, participants of Rock Camp spend their days climbing but return to main camp in the evening to be a part of the all-camp activities, and to bunk in one of the units. This is a beginner adventure program and is open to campers ages 12–15.

Rock Adventure
Offering a more advanced approach to rock climbing, campers on Rock Adventure take the basic climbing skills covered in Rock Camp and spend more time on the natural sandstone rocks in the area further enhancing their climbing skills. Participants experience the highlights of Southern Illinois rock climbing while taking on progressively more challenging routes. In order to maximize climbing time, campers spend their nights sleeping out under the stars along the shores of one of Camp Ondessonk's various lakes as well as in the Jackson Falls climbing area. Rock Adventure is an intermediate adventure open to campers ages 13–16.

Former adventure programs

Lodge of Ondessonk and Tekakwitha
The Lodge of Ondessonk and Tekakwitha embrace the honor camping society first established during Camp St. Philip in 1957. Induction into Lodge is the greatest honor for any camper. Induction into Lodge is open to campers, staff, and volunteers who demonstrate loyalty and dedication to camp in an exemplary way, and takes place each Thursday night during the summer in the Lodge ceremony. In order to be considered for Lodge, candidates much show these qualities as well as being at least a second year camper or staff member. Participants of both traditional camp and adventure programs are eligible. Members are divided geographically into councils, which act independently to give back to Ondessonk through fundraisers or service. Members of Lodge may also attend Fall and Spring Lodge Reunions each year. A member of Lodge is signified by a sash they wear, containing a patch of a simplified version of the symbol of Camp Ondessonk.  General members wear red and blue sashes. Both are more simply referred to as Lodge members.

After being absent since the 1970s, the Lodge arrowhead was reestablished in 2007 and can be earned by Lodge members over time through dedication to Lodge. There are also two other honors awarded by the Lodge of Ondessonk and Tekakwitha. The St. John de Brebeuf Award is given to an active or associate member for rendering meritorious service to Camp Ondessonk, the Lodge service organization, and the community. The John de LaLande Award is presented to a non-Lodge Member who is part of the Camp Ondessonk staff and feels that they do not meet the proper requirements for membership into the organization but have rendered meritorious service to Camp Ondessonk and the community.

Lodge Camp
Participants of Lodge Camp are able to enjoy many of the activities of traditional camp while being surrounded by fellow Lodge members. Campers stay in a unit made up of other Lodge members and led by a Lodge Official on staff. As part of their experience Lodge Campers participate in rock climbing at Pakentuck, the High Challenge Course, and an extended horseback ride. They also perform a service project for Camp, exemplifying the overall spirit of Lodge. Campers must be a member of the Loyal Lodge of Ondessonk and Tekakwitha in order to be eligible to attend. The program is open to campers meeting this requirement ages 11–16.

Lodge Trips
Beginning in the mid-1960s, Camp Ondessonk began organizing trips to destinations around the world as a reward for members of the Lodge of Ondessonk and Tekakwitha who sold specific quotas of advertisement space for the annual yearbook. Members were notified by a letter inviting them to participate free-of-charge. The trips took place over the Christmas holidays and went to places like Europe, Africa, and the Bahamas. They were usually 10 to 14 days long. In 1964 the trip left from Miami, Fl., on a yacht and sailed to the Bahama Islands where participants were able to enjoy a Christmas vacation of swimming, beach combing, shopping, and relaxation. The 1971 trip took participants on an Iberian tour through Spain, Portugal, and Morocco. One of the most memorable Lodge trips was in 1968 and went to Italy and Switzerland. This trip included the group attending Christmas Mass with the Pope during which the group was privileged to sit in ambassador seats just 20 feet from the Pope. They also spent New Year's Eve in Venice. The 1970 trip scheduled to tour the Middle East was canceled due to conflict in the region. The trips were eventually discontinued.

Off-Season programming

References

Ondessonk
Catholic Church in the United States
Roman Catholic Diocese of Belleville
Ondessonk